Julia Lorraine Hill (known as Julia Butterfly Hill, born February 18, 1974) is an American environmental activist and tax redirection advocate. She is best known for having lived in a -tall, approximately 1000-year-old California redwood tree for 738 days between December 10, 1997 and December 18, 1999. Hill lived in the tree, affectionately known as Luna, to prevent Pacific Lumber Company loggers from cutting it down. She is the author of the 2000 book The Legacy of Luna and co-author of One Makes the Difference.

Early life
Hill's father was a traveling minister who went from town to town, bringing his family with him. Until she was about ten years old, Hill lived in a  camper with her father Dale, mother Kathy, and brothers Mike and Dan. Julia is the middle child. While traveling with her family, Hill often explored rivers by campgrounds. When Hill was seven years old, she and her family were taking a hike one day when a butterfly landed on her finger and stayed with her for the duration of the hike. From that day on, her nickname became "Butterfly". She decided to use that as her nickname for the rest of her life.

When Hill was in middle school, her family stopped traveling and settled in Jonesboro, Arkansas. In August 1996, at age 22, Hill suffered a near-fatal car crash. At the time, Hill was acting as the designated driver for a friend who had been drinking. Her friend's car was hit from behind by a drunk driver. The steering wheel of the car penetrated Hill's skull.  It took almost a year of intensive therapy before she regained the ability to speak and walk normally.  She said:

Hill embarked on a spiritual quest afterward, leading her to the environmental cause opposed to the destruction of the redwood forests in Humboldt County, California.

Tree sit
After recuperating from her accident, Hill took a road trip to California and attended a reggae fundraiser to save the forests. A group of "front-liners" had been rotating tree sitters in and out of giant redwoods in Humboldt County every couple of days to stave off Pacific Lumber Co. loggers who were clear-cutting. The trees were on a windswept ridge overlooking the community of Stafford, south of Scotia. Organizers wanted someone to stay in the tree one week. "Nobody else would volunteer so they had to pick me", said Hill. 

Originally, Hill was not officially affiliated with any environmental organization, deciding by herself to undertake civil disobedience. Soon, Hill was actively supported by Earth First!, among other organizations, and by volunteers.

As the Moon was rising at the time, activists chose the name Luna, the Latin word for Moon, to commemorate the event.

Hill lived on two  platforms for 738 days. Hill learned many survival skills while living in Luna, such as "seldom washing the soles of her feet, because the sap helped her feet stick to the branches better." Hill used solar-powered cell phones for radio interviews, became an "in-tree" correspondent for a cable television show, and hosted TV crews to protest old-growth clear cutting. With ropes, Hill hoisted up survival supplies brought by an eight-member support crew. To keep warm, Hill wrapped herself tight in a sleeping bag, leaving only a small hole for breathing. For meals, Hill used a single-burner propane stove. Throughout her ordeal, Hill weathered freezing rains and  winds from El Niño, helicopter harassment, a ten-day siege by company security guards, and attempted intimidation by angry loggers.

A resolution was reached in 1999 when the Pacific Lumber Company agreed to preserve Luna and all trees within a  buffer zone. In exchange, Hill agreed to vacate the tree. In addition, the $50,000 that Hill and other activists raised during the cause was given to the logging company, as stipulated by the resolution.  The money was then donated to Humboldt State University as part of the agreement for research into sustainable forestry.

Vandals later cut into the tree with a chainsaw. A gash in the -tall redwood was discovered in November 2000 by one of Hill's supporters. The gash was treated with a herbal remedy, and the tree was stabilized with steel cables. They were assisted by Humboldt State University professor Steven Sillett. As of spring 2007, the tree was doing well with new growth each year. Caretakers routinely climb the tree to check its condition and to maintain the steel guywires. Luna is under the stewardship of Sanctuary Forest, a nonprofit organization.

Post-tree sit

Since her tree sit, Hill has become a motivational speaker (holding some 250 events a year), a best-selling author, and the co-founder of the Circle of Life Foundation (which helped organize We The Planet, an eco-friendly music tour) and the Engage Network, a nonprofit that trains small groups of civic leaders to work toward social change.

Ecuador oil pipeline protest
On July 16, 2002, Hill was jailed in Quito, Ecuador, outside the offices of Occidental Petroleum, for protesting a proposed oil pipeline that would penetrate a virgin Andean cloud forest that teems with rare birds. "The cloud forest is stunning," said Hill. "It's this deep, lush green, spangled with explosions of red, yellow and purple from the flowers, birds and insects. But the environmental destruction we saw along the pipelines that had already been built was horrendous." Ecuadorian President Gustavo Noboa commented: "The little gringos have been arrested, including the old cockatoo who climbs trees." Hill was later deported from Ecuador.

Tax redirection
In 2003, Hill became a proponent of tax redirection, resisting payment of about $150,000 in federal taxes, donating that money to after-school programs, arts and cultural programs, community gardens, programs for Native Americans, alternatives to incarceration, and environmental protection programs.  She said:

Farm sale protest
In 2006, Hill protested the sale of the South Central Farm in an attempt to save the  farm from developers.

Looking forward
In an April 2009 interview, Hill pondered what would come next for her:

Popular culture
Hill has been the subject of several documentaries, interviews, and books, including her own 2000 memoir, The Legacy of Luna, and has influenced numerous musicians.

 On December 10, 1998, a benefit concert was played at the Mateel Community Center in Redway, California, during Julia's "tree sit". Artists performing were Bob Weir and Mark Karan as an acoustic duet, the Steve Kimock Band, and the Mickey Hart Band. Hill took part in the event, reading her poem "Luna" via telephone while the Mickey Hart Band was performing "The Dancing Sorcerer".
 The character Sierra Tierwater in the 2000 novel A Friend of the Earth by T. Coraghessan Boyle was partially inspired by Hill.
 Hill was the subject of the documentary Butterfly (2000) broadcast on PBS POV.  She is also featured in the documentary film Tree-Sit: The Art of Resistance.  Both films document her time in the redwood tree.
 The 2000 twelfth-season episode of The Simpsons called "Lisa the Tree Hugger" was conceived when writer Matt Selman heard a news story about Hill.
 In Penn & Teller's 2003 first season of their documentary television show, Bullshit, Hill appeared as a Special Guest Expert on the episode "Environmental Hysteria".
 A film adaptation of The Legacy of Luna, to be directed by Laurie Collyer and star Rachel Weisz, became stuck in development hell, although Weisz actively worked towards getting the project off the ground.
 Hill and the events were featured in the 2010 Michael P. Henning documentary film Hempsters: Plant the Seed.
 The main character of the 2017 Swedish children's book Julia räddar skogen (Julia saves the forest) by Niklas Hill and Anna Palmqvist is named after Hill. The book is about a child who occupies a tree in order to hinder the construction of a new highway.

Music
 Trey Anastasio and Tom Marshall wrote a song called "Kissed by Mist" about Hill.
 In 2002 Los Suaves made a song in honor of Hill called "Julia Hill" on the Un paso atrás album in which the singer is "Luna".
 The Red Hot Chili Peppers 2003 song "Can't Stop" contains the line "J. Butterfly is in the treetop".
 Neil Young made a reference to Hill in the 2003 song "Sun Green" on the Greendale album in which the title character: "Still wants to meet Julia Butterfly".
 Casey Desmond wrote a song called "Julia Butterfly Hill" which appeared on her 2006 album No Disguise.
 In 2009, Idina Menzel wrote a song entitled "Butterfly" referring to Hill's concern for the environment.

References

Further reading 

 
 Ficklin, James and Penelope Andrews LUNA The Stafford Giant Tree Sit

External links

Sacred Awakening Series seminar with Julia
  Documentary Film Butterfly website - Documentary Film Butterfly website 
 P.O.V. Butterfly - PBS's site dedicated to the film

 
1974 births
Living people
American bloggers
American environmentalists
American women environmentalists
American motivational speakers
Women motivational speakers
American motivational writers
Women motivational writers
American non-fiction environmental writers
American tax resisters
People from Jonesboro, Arkansas
Anti-consumerists
Sustainability advocates
Women science writers
20th-century American non-fiction writers
20th-century American women writers
American women non-fiction writers
21st-century American non-fiction writers
American women bloggers
21st-century American women writers